Bayangan District is a district (bakhsh) in Paveh County, Kermanshah Province, Iran. At the 2006 census, its population was 8,987, in 2,134 families.  The District has two cities: Bayangan & Banevreh. The District has two rural districts (dehestan): Makvan Rural District and Shiveh Sar Rural District.

References 

Paveh County
Districts of Kermanshah Province